Chhayam is a traditional Khmer musical dance.

References 

Cambodian dances
Asian dances